The Bengals–Steelers rivalry is a National Football League (NFL) rivalry between the Cincinnati Bengals and the Pittsburgh Steelers. The two teams have played each other twice a year since becoming division rivals in 1970. Originally placed in the AFC Central following the 1970 AFL–NFL merger, the two teams currently compete in that division's successor, the AFC North. The rivalry would reach new heights in the 2000s in which the Steelers knocked the Bengals out of the playoffs, as well as injuring Carson Palmer, enroute to their fifth Super Bowl victory. The Bengals-Steelers rivalry is one of the biggest in the NFL.

The Steelers lead the overall series, 68–39.  The two teams met twice in the postseason, with the Steelers winning both games after the 2005 and 2015 seasons.

History

1970–73: Beginning of the rivalry 
Prior to 1970, the Steelers were members of the NFL and the Bengals were part of the AFL.  However, as part of the AFL-NFL merger, the two teams were placed in the AFC Central division along with the NFL's Cleveland Browns and the AFL's Houston Oilers.  Thus, the Bengals and Steelers have played each other twice every season since (except the strike-shortened 1982 campaign).

The Steelers defeated the Bengals in their first meeting, 21–10 at Pittsburgh's Three Rivers Stadium.  However, the Bengals would win the rematch in Cincinnati 34–7 during a 7-game winning streak that pushed the Bengals to the division championship.

The Steelers would win four of the next six meetings to take a 5–3 series lead early in its history.

1974–79: Steelers' Super Bowl dynasty 

The Steelers dominated the rivalry – and the entire NFL – mid-to-late 1970s, posting a 9–3 record against the Bengals during this time.  The Steelers won four Super Bowls during these six years.

The Steelers were led by their "Steel Curtain" defense, as they held the Bengals to 17 points or less during ten of the twelve meetings during this stretch.  The Steelers were also able to win two games despite scoring a single touchdown as they won 7–3 in 1976 and 7–6 in 1978 – the two lowest-scoring games in the history of the rivalry.  The Steelers would also win six straight games from 1974 to 1977.

One bright spot for the Bengals occurred in their 1979 meeting in Cincinnati.  The Bengals, who were 0–6 entering the game, forced nine Steelers turnovers on their way to a 34–10 blowout win over the Steelers.

1980–90:  Bengals' resurgence 
On October 12, 1980, the Bengals defeated the Steelers 17–16 at Three Rivers Stadium, snapping the Steelers' 18-game home winning streak and their undefeated 10–0 record at home against the Bengals.  This game, along with an earlier Bengals' win in Cincinnati, were the only two losses for the then-4–2 Steelers, as they eventually finished 9–7, missing the playoffs for the first time since 1971.

The Bengals swept the 1981 season series as well, on their way to their first Super Bowl appearance.

Because of the 1982 NFL Players Strike, the game in Cincinnati that season was cancelled. The Steelers won the only meeting of the year in Pittsburgh, 26–20 in overtime. This marks the only season in which the Steelers and Bengals did not meet twice.

The Bengals closed the gap of the Steelers' lead throughout the 1980s.  On November 6, 1988, the Bengals defeated the Steelers 42–7, the largest margin of victory for either team in the series.  The Bengals went on to Super Bowl XXIII that season, their most recent appearance in a Super Bowl until 2021.

The Bengals won six straight meetings from 1988 to 1990, which gave them a 21–20 lead in the overall series after the 1990 season.  To date, this is the only time the Bengals led the series.

1991–2003: Steelers in contention, Bengals struggle 
The Steelers returned to dominating the rivalry in the 1990s.  Immediately following the Bengals' six-game winning streak, Pittsburgh won eight straight meetings from 1991 to 1994.

On November 30, 1992, the Steelers sacked Bengals quarterback David Klingler ten times, one short of the single-game NFL record, en route to a 21–9 Steelers win.  Combined with a 20–0 victory earlier in the season, the Steelers did not allow a touchdown to the Bengals in either of their two meetings that year.

On October 19, 1995, the Bengals defeated the Steelers, 27–9 on Thursday Night Football.  Despite outgaining the Bengals by 100 yards, the Steelers could not reach the end zone.  In their second game that season, the Bengals had a 31–13 lead in the third quarter, but the Steelers scored 36 unanswered points to win 49–31.  The Steelers would play in Super Bowl XXX that season, but lose to the Dallas Cowboys.

In 1998, the Bengals struggled to a 3–13 record, however, two of those wins came against the Steelers, as the Bengals earned their first sweep of the Steelers since 1990, and these two led to Bill Cowher's first losing season as Steelers head coach.

Both teams opened new stadiums in the early 2000s.  The Bengals opened Paul Brown Stadium in 2000 and the Steelers opened Heinz Field.  The two teams opened Heinz Field on October 7, 2001, a 16–7 Steelers win.  The Steelers dominated the series in the early 2000s as they were perennial playoff contenders, while the Bengals finished near the bottom of the league.

2004–2021: The Ben Roethlisberger era 
Both teams drafted franchise quarterbacks in the early-to-mid 2000s.  The Bengals drafted Carson Palmer first overall in 2003, while the Steelers selected Ben Roethlisberger in the first round the following year.  Roethlisberger's Steelers have posted a 24–10 record against the Bengals, including wins in two playoff meetings.

The Steelers and Bengals met in the Playoffs for the first time in a 2005 AFC wild card game in Cincinnati.  The Bengals lost Palmer to an injury on their first drive, but built a 17–7 lead.  The Steelers to score 24 unanswered points to defeat the Bengals, 31–17.  The Steelers would go on to win Super Bowl XL that season.

The Steelers swept the Bengals in 2007 and 2008, on their way to consecutive division titles and a Super Bowl XLIII win following the 2008 season.

In 2009, the Bengals swept the Steelers and won all of their division game for the first time in franchise history.  The game in Cincinnati marked Roethlisberger's first loss in his home state of Ohio, having previously been 10–0 at Cincinnati and Cleveland.

Palmer announced his intention to retire after the 2010 season (although he would later return to the NFL with the Oakland Raiders and Arizona Cardinals) and the Bengals drafted Andy Dalton in 2011.  The Steelers continued to dominate the rivalry, going 13–3 against Dalton's Bengals.

The teams' second postseason meeting occurred in the 2015 AFC Wild Card game in Cincinnati.  The Steelers built a 15–0 after three quarters, however Roethlisberger had left the game due to an injury. Bengals quarterback A. J. McCarron, starting for an injured Dalton, led the Bengals to 16 straight points. However, Steelers linebacker Ryan Shazier would force Bengals running back Jeremy Hill to fumble and the Steelers recovered the loose ball. Roethlisberger returned and led the Steelers on their final drive. On an incomplete pass to Antonio Brown, Bengals linebacker Vontaze Burfict was flagged for unnecessary roughness on a brutal and concussing blow to Brown's head; the hit subsequently led to the suspension of Burfict for the first three games of 2016. Immediately afterwards, Bengals cornerback Adam Jones was flagged for a personal foul due to an altercation with Steelers assistant coach Joey Porter. From there, Steelers kicker Chris Boswell made the game-winning field goal from 35 yards.

In a 2017 game, the Bengals took a 17–0 lead, but the Steelers outscored them 23–3 the rest of the game for 23–20 win. The game was a brutal affair with serious injuries to Shazier, Mixon and  Burfict and subsequent suspensions to JuJu Smith-Schuster and George Iloka (with Iloka's later being overturned). The two teams clocked up four penalties for unnecessary roughness, one for unsportsmanlike conduct, one for roughing the passer and another for taunting. The Bengals themselves clocked up 13 penalties for 173 yards.

In 2018, Roethlisberger led the Steelers to a come-from behind 28–21 win with a late touchdown pass to Antonio Brown.  During that game, Burfict was fined $112,000 for illegal hits on Brown and Steelers running back James Conner. There was also controversy surrounding the next play when Burfict pointed at JuJu Smith-Schuster and told him "You're next." In their first meeting of the 2019 season, the Steelers, led by backup quarterback Mason Rudolph, defeated the Bengals for a record ninth time in a row.

During the 2020 season, Bengals rookie quarterback Joe Burrow made his debut in the rivalry, throwing for 215 yards and a touchdown, but it was the Steelers who came away with a 36-10 win. Despite the fact that Burrow suffered a season-ending injury the following week, the Bengals snapped an 11-game losing streak to the Steelers during their Week 15 Monday Night Football rematch, winning 27–17.

In 2021, the Bengals, now with a fully healthy Burrow under center, swept the Steelers for the first time since 2009 en route to the first AFC North division title and playoff appearance since 2015. Both teams went on to make the playoffs that season; the Steelers were eliminated in the first round by the Kansas City Chiefs while the Bengals made it to Super Bowl LVI (which they lost to the Los Angeles Rams). After the season, Ben Roethlisberger announced his retirement.

2022–present  
During Week 1 of the  season, the Steelers defeated the Bengals in Cincinnati. 23-20 in overtime victory, led by new Steelers quarterback Mitchell Trubisky.

Season-by-season results 

|-
| 
| Tie 1–1
| style="| Bengals  34–7
| style="|Steelers  21–10
| Tie  1–1
| AFL-NFL merger.  Both teams placed in AFC Central. 
|-
| 
| style="| Steelers 2–0
| style="| Steelers  21–13
| style="| Steelers  21–10
| Steelers  3–1
|
|-
| 
| Tie 1–1
| style="| Bengals  15–10
| style="|Steelers  40–17
| Steelers  4–2
|
|-
| 
| Tie, 1–1
| style="| Bengals  17–10
| style="|Steelers  20–13
| Steelers  5–3
|
|-
| 
| Tie, 1–1
| style="| Bengals  17–10
| style="| Steelers  27–3
| Steelers  6–4
| Steelers win Super Bowl IX
|-
| 
| style="| Steelers 2–0
| style="| Steelers  30–24
| style="| Steelers  35–14
| Steelers  8–4
| Steelers win Super Bowl X
|-
| 
| style="| Steelers 2–0
| style="| Steelers  7–3
| style="| Steelers  23–6
| Steelers  10–4
| 
|-
| 
| Tie 1–1
| style="| Bengals  17–10
| style="| Steelers  20–14
| Steelers  11–5
| 
|-
| 
| style="| Steelers 2–0
| style="| Steelers  28–3
| style="| Steelers  7–6
| Steelers  13–5
| Steelers win Super Bowl XIII.
|-
| 
| Tie 1–1
| style="| Bengals  34–10
| style="| Steelers  37–17
| Steelers  14–6
| Steelers commit nine turnovers in loss at Cincinnati.  Steelers win Super Bowl XIV.
|-

|-
| 
| style="|Bengals 2–0
| style="|Bengals  30–28
| style="|Bengals  17–16
| Steelers  14–8
| Bengals' first ever win in Pittsburgh (they had been 0-10).
|-
| 
| style="|Bengals 2–0
| style="|Bengals  34–7
| style="|Bengals  17–10
| Steelers  14–10
| Bengals lose Super Bowl XVI.
|-
| 
| style="| Steelers 1–0
| no game
| style="| Steelers  26–20 (OT)
| Steelers  15–10
| Game in Cincinnati was cancelled as a result of the nine-week players' strike.
|-
| 
| Tie, 1–1
| style="| Steelers  24–14
| style="|Bengals  23–10
| Steelers  16–11
| Steelers win game in Cincinnati despite not scoring any offensive touchdowns.
|-
| 
| Tie 1–1
| style="| Bengals  22–20
| style="| Steelers  38–17
| Steelers  17–12
| 
|-
| 
| style="|Bengals 2–0
| style="|Bengals  26–21
| style="|Bengals  37–24
| Steelers  17–14
| 
|-
| 
| Tie, 1–1
| style="| Steelers  30–9
| style="|Bengals  24–22
| Steelers  18–15
| 
|-
| 
| style="| Steelers 2–0
| style="| Steelers  30–16
| style="| Steelers  23–20
| Steelers  20–15
| 
|-
| 
| style="|Bengals 2–0
| style="|Bengals  42–7
| style="|Bengals  17–12
| Steelers  20–17
| Bengals' 42–7 win is largest margin of victory in rivalry Bengals lose Super Bowl XXIII.
|-
| 
| style="| Bengals 2–0
| style="|Bengals  41–10
| style="|Bengals  26–16
| Steelers  20–19
|
|-
|-

|-
| 
| style="| Bengals 2–0
| style="|Bengals  27–3
| style="|Bengals  16–12
| Bengals  21–20
| Bengals take first and, to date, only lead in the overall series.
|-
| 
| style="| Steelers 2–0
| style="| Steelers  33–27
| style="| Steelers  17–10
| Steelers  22–21 
|
|-
| 
| style="| Steelers 2–0
| style="| Steelers  21–9
| style="| Steelers  20–0
| Steelers  24–21
| 
|-
| 
| style="| Steelers 2–0
| style="| Steelers  24–16
| style="| Steelers  37–7
| Steelers  26–21
|
|-
| 
| style="| Steelers 2–0
| style="| Steelers  38–35
| style="| Steelers  14–10
| Steelers  28–21
| Steelers win 8 straight meetings from 1991-94.
|-
| 
| Tie 1–1 
| style="| Steelers  49–31
| style="|Bengals  27–9
| Steelers  29–22
| Steelers score 36 unanswered points after trailing 31–13 in the 3rd quarter in Cincinnati.  Steelers lose Super Bowl XXX.
|-
| 
| Tie 1–1
| style="| Bengals  34–24
| style="|Steelers  20–10
| Steelers  30–23
|
|-
| 
| style="| Steelers 2–0
| style="| Steelers  26–10
| style="| Steelers  20–3
| Steelers  32–23
|
|-
| 
| style="| Bengals 2–0
| style="|Bengals  25–20
| style="|Bengals  25–24
| Steelers  32–25
| Bengals sweep season series despite a 3–13 record on the season.
|-
| 
| Tie 1–1 
| style="| Steelers  17–3
| style="|Bengals  27–20
| Steelers  33–26
| 
|-

|-
| 
| style="| Steelers 2–0
| style="| Steelers  48–28
| style="| Steelers  15–0
| Steelers  35–26
| Bengals open Paul Brown Stadium.
|-
| 
| Tie 1–1
| style="|  Bengals  26–23 (OT)
| style="|  Steelers  16–7
| Steelers  36–27
| Steelers open Heinz Field. Bengals win game in Cincinnati after rallying from 23–10 fourth quarter deficit.
|-
| 
| style="| Steelers 2–0
| style="| Steelers  34–7
| style="| Steelers  29–21
| Steelers  38–27
| 
|-
| 
| Tie 1–1
| style="| Steelers  17–10
| style="| Bengals  24–20
| Steelers  39–28
| 
|-
| 
| style="| Steelers 2–0
| style="| Steelers  19–14
| style="| Steelers  28–17
| Steelers  41–28
|
|-
| 
| Tie 1–1
| style="| Steelers  27–13
| style="| Bengals  38–31
| Steelers  42–29
| Steelers win Super Bowl XL. 
|- 
! 2005 Playoffs
! style="| Steelers 1–0
! style="| Steelers  31–17
!
! Steelers  43–29
! AFC Wild Card Round. First postseason meeting in the series.  Bengals QB Carson Palmer suffers injury on Bengals' second offensive play. Bengals take early 17–7 lead. However, Steelers would rally to score 24 unanswered points for the win.
|-
| 
| Tie 1–1
| style="| Steelers  23–17 (OT)
| style="| Bengals  28–20
| Steelers  44–30
| Steelers' win in Cincinnati knocks the Bengals out of playoff contention; was also Bill Cowher's final game as Steelers' head coach. 
|-
| 
| style="| Steelers 2–0
| style="| Steelers  24–13
| style="| Steelers  24–10
| Steelers  46–30
|
|-
| 
| style="| Steelers 2–0
| style="| Steelers  38–10
| style="| Steelers  27–10
| Steelers  48–30
| Steelers win eighth straight game in Cincinnati.  Steelers win Super Bowl XLIII.
|-
| 
| style="| Bengals 2–0
| style="|Bengals  23–20
| style="|Bengals  18–12
| Steelers  48–32
| Steelers QB Ben Roethlisberger suffers first loss in his home state of Ohio (he had been 10–0 in Cincinnati and Cleveland). Bengals win all of their division games for the first time in franchise history.
|-

|-
| 
| style="| Steelers 2–0
| style="| Steelers  27–21
| style="| Steelers  23–7
| Steelers  50–32
| Steelers lose Super Bowl XLV.
|-
| 
| style="| Steelers 2–0
| style="| Steelers  38–10
| style="| Steelers  27–10
| Steelers  52–32
| 
|-
| 
| Tie 1–1
| style="| Steelers  24–17
| style="| Bengals  13–10
| Steelers  53–33
| Bengals clinch playoff spot with win in Pittsburgh.
|-
| 
| Tie 1–1
| style="|  Bengals  20–10
| style="|  Steelers  30–20
| Steelers  54–34
| 
|-
| 
| style="| Steelers 2–0
| style="| Steelers  42–21
| style="| Steelers  27–17
| Steelers  56–34
| Steelers clinch AFC North title in final game of the season in Pittsburgh.
|-
| 
| Tie 1–1
| style="| Steelers  33–20
| style="| Bengals  16–10
| Steelers  57–35
| 
|-
! 2015 Playoffs
! style="| Steelers 1–0
! style="| Steelers  18–16
!
! Steelers  58–35
! AFC Wild Card Round.  The Bengals led 16–15 with a chance to run the clock out, but RB Jeremy Hill fumbled to give the Steelers one last chance. After two late Bengals personal fouls including a brutal hit by Vontaze Burfict that led to a three-game suspension, K Chris Boswell made the game-winning 35-yard field goal.
|-
| 
| style="| Steelers 2–0
| style="| Steelers  24–20
| style="| Steelers  24–16
| Steelers  60–35
| Steelers' K Chris Boswell makes a franchise record six field goals at Cincinnati
|-
| 
| style="| Steelers 2–0
| style="| Steelers  23–20
| style="| Steelers  29–14
| Steelers  62–35
| Game in Cincinnati was a brutal affair with serious injuries to Steelers' LB Ryan Shazier and Bengals' LB Vontaze Burfict and subsequent suspensions to Steelers' WR JuJu Smith-Schuster and Bengals' S George Iloka (Iloka's was later rescinded).
|-
| 
| style="| Steelers 2–0
| style="| Steelers  28–21
| style="| Steelers  16–13
| Steelers  64–35
|
|-
| 
| style="| Steelers 2–0
| style="| Steelers  16–10
| style="| Steelers  27–3
| Steelers  66–35
| Steelers win 7 straight meetings in Cincinnati (2014–19).
|-

|-
| 
| Tie 1–1
| style="| Bengals  27–17
| style="| Steelers  36–10
| Steelers  67–36
| Steelers win 11 straight meetings (2015–20).
|-
| 
| style="| Bengals 2–0
| style="| Bengals  41–10
| style="| Bengals  24–10
| Steelers  67–38
| Bengals sweep season series for first time since 2009. Bengals lose Super Bowl LVI.
|-
| 
| Tie 1–1
| style="| Steelers  23–20 (OT) 
| style="| Bengals  37–30
| Steelers  68–39
|
|- 

|-
| Regular Season
| style="|Steelers 66–39
| Steelers 32–20
| Steelers 34–19
| 
|-
| Postseason games
| style="|Steelers 2–0
| Steelers 2–0
| no games
| AFC Wild Card Round: 2005, 2015
|-
| Regular and postseason 
| style="|Steelers 68–39
| Steelers 34–20
| Steelers 34–19
| 
|-

References 

Cincinnati Bengals
Pittsburgh Steelers
National Football League rivalries
Pittsburgh Steelers rivalries
Cincinnati Bengals rivalries